The Nationaal Militair Museum (NMM) is a military museum in Soesterberg, Netherlands. It focuses on the history of the Dutch Armed Forces with emphasis on the Royal Netherlands Army and the Royal Netherlands Air Force. The Stichting Koninklijke Defensiemusea (Royal Defense Museums Foundation) oversees the museum. 

Its collection derives from the Legermuseum in Delft and the Militaire Luchtvaart Museum in Soesterberg, which were merged to form the NMM in 2014.

The museum occupies the site of the former Soesterberg Air Base.

See also
Bundeswehr Museum of German Defense Technology – Koblenz, Germany
Deutsches Panzermuseum – Munster, Germany
Australian Armour and Artillery Museum – Australia
Musée des Blindés – Paris, France
Royal Tank Museum – Amman, Jordan
The Tank Museum – Bovington, United Kingdom
United States Army Ordnance Museum
Polish Army Museum – Warsaw, Poland

References

Aerospace museums in the Netherlands
Military and war museums in the Netherlands